Wincenty of Kielcza (c. 1200 – after 1262) was a Polish canon, poet, and composer, working in Kraków and writing in Latin. He was a member of the Dominican Order.

Most likely born in the village of Kielcza, he is best known for his hymn "Gaude Mater Polonia". Wincenty also wrote a shorter and a longer life of Saint Stanislaus of Szczepanów for his canonization.

References  

1200s births
1260s deaths
Polish composers
Canons of Kraków
Polish Dominicans